Ryan Stewart (born June 1, 1967) is a Canadian former ice hockey player. He played three games in the National Hockey League for the Winnipeg Jets during the 1985–86 season scoring one goal.

Career statistics

Regular season and playoffs

Coaching statistics
Season  Team                Lge   Type  
1993-94 Merritt Centennials BCJHL Assistant Coach 
1997-98 Kelowna Rockets     WHL   Assistant Coach

External links
 

1967 births
Living people
Brandon Wheat Kings players
Canadian ice hockey centres
Ice hockey people from British Columbia
Kamloops Blazers players
Kamloops Junior Oilers players
National Hockey League first-round draft picks
Portland Winterhawks players
Prince Albert Raiders players
Sportspeople from Kelowna
Winnipeg Jets (1979–1996) draft picks
Winnipeg Jets (1979–1996) players